Fresh Meadows may refer to:
Fresh Meadows, Queens
Fresh Meadow Country Club, a country club with a golf course Lake Success, New York, located in Queens until 1946
Fresh Meadows, Kentucky